Calymenella is a genus of trilobites in the order Phacopida, which existed in what is now France during the upper Ordovician. It was described by Bergeron in 1890, and the type species is Calymenella boisseli. The species was described from the Glauzy Formation in the Montagne Noire mountain range.

References

External links
 Calymenella at the Paleobiology Database

Phacopida genera
Sandbian
Ordovician trilobites of Europe
Fossils of the Czech Republic
Letná Formation
Fossils of France
Fossil taxa described in 1890